Tom Loepp (born June 4, 1954) is an American figurative, portrait and landscape painter.

Life 
Loepp grew up in Wyoming, Texas, Iowa and Oklahoma. He began his art studies in 1972 at the Art Students Academy in Tulsa, Oklahoma, then moved to New York City in 1976 and studied at the Art Students League of New York; this was followed by a year of travel through Europe. He returned to New York, where he painted cityscapes, some from atop the World Trade Center, and began a career as a portrait painter. In 2001 he returned to Wyoming.

In 1994 Loepp painted a portrait of Chief Justice William Rehnquist for the United States Supreme Court. The painting was subsequently placed near Rehnquist's coffin when his body lay in state after his death in 2005; the New York Times described the painting as showing "the four gold stripes with which the chief justice decorated each sleeve of his judicial robe and depicts him with a slightly bemused expression".

In addition to the Supreme Court, Loepp's paintings are in the collections of the Museum of the City of New York, Stanford Law School, University of Chicago, and William and Flora Hewlett Foundation. He has exhibited at the Brooklyn Museum, the Nicolaysen Art Museum and  the Dahl Arts Center in South Dakota.

Loepp has taught drawing and painting in numerous venues, including the Art Students League of New York, the National Academy in New York City and the Gage Academy of Art in Seattle

Notes

References
 Gage Academy
 Nicolaysen Art Museum
 Instructors and Lecturers - Past and Present, Art Students League of New York
 Larson, Kay. Italian Fantasies, New York Facts, New York Magazine Nov 21, 1983.
 Portrait of William Rehnquist, OYEZ
 Obermayer, Herman. Rehnquist: A Personal Portrait of the Distinguished Chief Justice of the United States. Simon and Schuster, 2009
 Bush and First Lady Visit Rehnquist's Coffin at Court The New York Times, September 7, 2005

External links
 Tom Loepp official website
 Loepp as subject of Wyoming Portraits, broadcast on Wyoming Public Television
 Portrait of Judith R. Shapiro, president of Barnard College

Artists from Wyoming
Painters from New York City
20th-century American painters
Place of birth missing (living people)
American male painters
21st-century American painters
21st-century American male artists
1954 births
Living people
20th-century American male artists